The Durrells (known in North America as The Durrells in Corfu) is a British comedy-drama television series loosely based on Gerald Durrell's three autobiographical books about his family's four years (1935–1939) on the Greek island of Corfu. It aired on ITV from 3 April 2016 to 12 May 2019. The series is written by Simon Nye, directed by Steve Barron and Roger Goldby, and produced by Christopher Hall. Lee Durrell, Gerald Durrell's widow and director of the Durrell Wildlife Conservation Trust, acted as consultant. The series was partly filmed on location in Corfu, as well as at Ealing Studios and Twickenham Studios in London.

Premise
The series begins in 1935, when Louisa Durrell suddenly announces that she and her four children will move from Bournemouth to the Greek island of Corfu. Her husband died some years earlier and the family is experiencing financial problems. A  struggle ensues as the family adapts to life on the island and a shortage of money. Despite a lack of electricity and of modern sewage systems, Corfu proves to be a cheap and earthly paradise.

Cast and characters

Episodes

Series 1 (2016) 
1935

Series 2 (2017) 
1936

Series 3 (2018)
1937

A third series was confirmed to be in production by writer Simon Nye at the BFI and Radio Times Television Festival on 8 April 2017. He described the third series as having "some exotic new animals", and that production would begin in three weeks' time, upon Keeley Hawes's arrival in Corfu for filming. It is set in 1937.

Series 4 (2019)
1939

Reception

Critical reception
Reception to the first episode was positive, with Gerard O'Donovan (The Telegraph) calling it "a series that's not only sun-drenched and liberating, but also catches its source material's high good humour without labouring it and weaves an authentic sense of the innocent exoticism of the original," before awarding it four stars.

Viewership
The opening episode averaged just under 6.4 million people and was watched by 29% of the audience over the hour, including those watching on British television network ITV's +1 channel, and was the biggest drama launch of any channel so far in 2016 and the most-watched show of the day (including +1). Following a seven-day catch-up period, the figure aggregated to just under 8.2 million people. Citing the show as its "best rating new drama of the year and its highest rating new show since September 2014", ITV recommissioned the show for a second series on 15 April 2016. Over the course of the first series, ratings averaged out at 6.9 million viewers.

Awards and nominations

Broadcast
Internationally, the series was acquired in Australia by the Seven Network and premiered on 24 August 2016. In the United States, PBS began airing the show, retitled as The Durrells in Corfu, on 16 October 2016 at 8 pm. The Durrells started screening in New Zealand on 26 October 2016 on Prime TV. In Canada, the Canadian Broadcasting Corporation began airing Series 1 on 13 September 2017. In Spain, the series has been acquired by the streaming platform .

The third series of The Durrells was announced by writer Simon Nye at the BFI and Radio Times Television Festival on 8 April 2017. It began filming in May 2017 and aired on ITV in the Northern Hemisphere in the spring of 2018.

A fourth series was announced by ITV on 22 June 2018, with filming scheduled for later in the year. It was transmitted between 8 April and 12 May 2019. This has been confirmed as the final series.

Home media

See also
 Gerald Durrell's Corfu trilogy books:
 My Family and Other Animals (1956)
 Birds, Beasts, and Relatives (1969)
 The Garden of the Gods (1978)
 My Family and Other Animals, a 1987 BBC series based on the book by the same name
 My Family and Other Animals, a 2005 BBC telemovie based on the book by the same name

References

External links
 
 

2016 British television series debuts
2019 British television series endings
2010s British drama television series
English-language television shows
ITV television dramas
Period family drama television series
Television series by BBC Studios
Television series about dysfunctional families
Television series about siblings
Television series about widowhood
Television series set in the 1930s
Television shows set in Greece